City Centre Mall (also known as  Shimoga Bus Terminal Mall) is a shopping mall located in Shimoga, Karnataka, and is the city's first shopping mall. It was developed by UAE based EKK Group, and is attached to the KSRTC bus station.

About the Mall
The mall is jointly managed with Cushman & Wakefield, and also houses Future Group's Big Bazaar hyper market.

About EKK Group
UAE based EKK Group is a AED100 million enterprise founded by E.K. Kader Hajee. Currently led by Mohamed Sohel E.K., EKK Group has business activities in Dubai, Sharjah, Ajman, Mumbai, Karnataka and Kerala and is involved in varied industries including retail chains, hospitality, restaurants and  real estate.

See also 
 Shimoga
 List of shopping malls in India

References

External links
 City Centre Mall Official Website
 Ekk Group Official Website

Shimoga
Shopping malls in Karnataka
Buildings and structures in Shimoga district
2014 establishments in Karnataka
Shopping malls established in 2014